Call to Cosplay is an American reality television series on Asian American cable network Myx TV. It is a cosplay design competition show where contestants are tasked to create a costume based on a given theme and under time constraints. The show is the first wholly cosplay-based competition show in the United States. It premiered on June 30, 2014 and concluded on May 10, 2016.

Episodes

References

External links
 

2010s American reality television series
2014 American television series debuts
2016 American television series endings
Cosplay